Montferrat is a commune in the Var department in the Provence-Alpes-Côte d'Azur region in southeastern France.

See also
Communes of the Var department

Notable buildings 

 Church of Saint-Roch.
 Chapelle Notre-Dame de Beauvoir, perched at 660m altitude.

References

Communes of Var (department)